Elachista antipetra is a moth in the family Elachistidae. It was described by Edward Meyrick in 1922. It is found in India.

The wingspan is about 6 mm. The forewings are dark brown, the proximal part of the wing is lighter and sparsely covered with brown scales on a greyish ground colour, the wing is darker beyond its middle. The transverse fascia are antemedian, white and slightly oblique and blackish-brown scales form a blurred patch just beyond the fascia and between the costal and tornal spots. The hindwings are dark brown, but slightly lighter basally.

References

Moths described in 1922
antipetra
Moths of Asia